Aberavon is a settlement and community in Neath Port Talbot county borough, Wales.

Aberavon may also refer to:

 Aberavon (UK Parliament constituency)
 Aberavon (electoral ward), in Baglan and Baglan Bay
 Aberavon (Senedd constituency)
 Aberavon (Seaside) railway station